Towards the Light (Chinese: 向着光亮那方) aka "Towards the Bright Side" is a song recorded by Chinese singer Xu Weizhou. The single was officially released on 2 May 2016 as one of the promotional songs of the film Yesterday Once More

Background
Towards the Light is a soundtrack with a length of four minutes and thirty seconds. It pertains to the struggles and passion of youths. Its music video was first released on 21 April 2016 for the promotion of the film Yesterday Once More but the single was officially released on 2 May 2016. It gained praises and it was the first time a song achieved top spots on both China V chart and Mandarin chart in Billboard China at the same week. 

Xu Weizhou performed the song live on his "First Light Asia Tour" with the other songs from his album  Light. Afterwards, he performed it on music festivals such as Forest Music Festival, Zebra Music Festival and 20th PEACEBIRD Music Festival on late 2016.

Composition
This single was composed by Chen Yu while the lyrics was written by Tintin Zhang. It was produced by Liu Tong, vice president of Beijing Enlight Pictures and the writer of the said movie.  Liu stated that they chose Xu to sing Towards the Light because they think he is very suitable for it and "it also wasn't easy for him to be known by people, but because of certain policy reasons, he was being suppressed"; pertaining to the ban of Xu to appear on television shows by SAPPRFT but Liu added that people can't blame the higher-ups because things got out of control. He also added that "...even though he is in this state right now, he will definitely still head towards the direction of the light and become better and better".

Chart performance

Weekly

Year-end

References

2016 songs
2016 singles